The Summit Playhouse is a theater in Summit, New Jersey and home to one of the oldest continuously operating amateur community theaters in the United States producing a new show each calendar season. In 2011, it presented Meet Me in St. Louis, Closer Than Ever,  and Speed the Plow.

History
The original stone Romanesque building designed by Arthur Bates Jennings was constructed in 1891 as the town's first library. A municipally-operated Summit Public Library was established in 1900, and in 1910 the library was moved to another building, leaving the Romanesque building under-utilized but still belonging to the library. In 1918, The Playhouse Association was founded as a World War I relief organization, and the theatrical group rented the empty older library from the Summit Library Association for one dollar a year for the next fifty years on condition that the group maintain the facility. In 1960, a 120-seat auditorium was added and the original 1891 structure was converted into a stage. The Summit Library Association officially deeded the building to the theater in 1968.

Directors
Norman Lee Swartout (1918)

References

External links
Summit Playhouse

Library buildings completed in 1891
Theatres in New Jersey
Buildings and structures in Union County, New Jersey
Tourist attractions in Union County, New Jersey
Summit, New Jersey
Community theatre
Theatres on the National Register of Historic Places in New Jersey
National Register of Historic Places in Union County, New Jersey
1891 establishments in New Jersey
New Jersey Register of Historic Places